Jolie Holland and the Quiet Orkestra Live is a live album recorded in November 2002 at the Birdhouse. The album includes tracks that subsequently appeared on Jolie Holland's Catalpa, Escondida, and Springtime Can Kill You albums. Alternatively, the album may be referred to as "Euphoria Jackson and the Quiet Orchestra."

Track listing

 "Don't get trouble on your mind" – 3:44
 "Spooky Pony Blues" – 4:06
 "Do You . . . ?" – 4:28
 "Sascha" – 3:58
 "Catalpa Waltz" – 4:59
 "Alley Flowers" – 4:17
 "Nothing to do but dream" – 6:46
 "Ghost Waltz" – 3:23
 "Lay your black hand down" – 4:57

Personnel

 Musicians - Enzo Garcia, Brian Miller, Kate Klaire, Sean Hayes, and Jolie Holland 
 Recorded by Simon DeGeorge
 Producer - Jolie Holland
 Mixing  - Chris Arnold
 Album photographer - Mary Beth Coyne
 Album designer -  Adam Wolf

Jolie Holland albums
2002 live albums